Legend of Makai (Japanese: Makai Densetsu) is an arcade video game from 1988.  It was produced by Japanese video game manufacturer Jaleco.

Gameplay

Legend of Makai is an action/adventure platformer based in a fantasy setting.  The player controls a young warrior whose quest is to rescue a princess from an evil wizard.  The warrior starts off with only a sword, but can purchase other weapons and magical items from shops.  The gameplay consists finding one's way through non-linear levels, using keys to open doors and killing or avoiding various enemies.  The player has a fixed amount of time to complete each level.

Reception
In Japan, Game Machine listed Legend of Makai on their September 1, 1988 issue as being the twenty-first most-successful table arcade unit of the month. Legend of Makai was favourably reviewed by Power Play's Martin Gaksch, who praised the game's mix of action and adventure, but also criticized the graphics.

References

External links

Legend of Makai at the Arcade History database

1988 video games
Arcade video games
Arcade-only video games
Nintendo Switch games
PlayStation 4 games
NMK (company) games
Platform games
Jaleco games
Video games developed in Japan
Hamster Corporation games